Burma Convoy is a 1941 film about a truck convoy on the Burma Road directed by Noel M. Smith and starring Charles Bickford and Evelyn Ankers.

It was also known as Halfway to Shanghai.

Plot
In the Burmese town of Lashio, the convoys of an American transport company keep being attacked. Head driver is Cliff Weldon. His brother Mike comes to visit. They deal with a Eurasian spy, a Chinese agent and enemy attacks.

Cast
Charles Bickford as Cliff Weldon
Evelyn Ankers as Ann McBragel
Frank Albertson as Mike Weldon
Cecil Kellaway as Angus McBragel
Willie Fung as Smitty
Keye Luke as Lin Taiyen
Turhan Bey as Mr. Yuchau
Truman Bradley as Victor Harrison
Ken Christy as Hank
C. Montague Shaw as Major Hart
Harry Stubbs as Hubert
Chester Gan as Keela
Vyola Vonn as Mazie
Eddie Lee as Leon
Dorothy Vaughan as Mrs. Hubert
Grace Lem as Mrs. Wong Lee
Dave Thursby as Constable
Duke York as Bartender
Loo Loy as Rebel leader

Production
The film was announced in April 1941 as Halfway to Shanghai. It was an early lead role for Evelyn Ankers who had joined the studio after being on stage in Ladies in Retirement. Filming took place in April and May 1941.

The film was one of a number being set in the Burma Road around this time, others including A Yank on the Burma Road, Burma Road and Over the Burma Road, with the latter two not being filmed.

Reception
The New York Times thought the film was "too tame".

References

External links

Burma Convoy at BFI
Burma Convoy at Letterbox DVD

1941 films
Trucker films
1941 adventure films
American black-and-white films
Films set in Myanmar
Universal Pictures films
American adventure films
1940s English-language films
Films directed by Noel M. Smith
1940s American films